Jessica Dunphy (born October 23, 1984) is an American actress. Originally from Glenside, Pennsylvania, Dunphy's most prominent roles include Devin Pillsbury on The Sopranos and Alison Stewart on the soap opera As the World Turns from 2002 to 2005. She has also appeared in the films Storytelling (2001) and Pizza (2005).

Filmography

Film

Television

References

External links

1984 births
American soap opera actresses
Living people
People from Montgomery County, Pennsylvania
21st-century American women